Alf Kristian Theodor Wiig (24 August 1891 – 10 July 1974) was a Norwegian bishop in the Church of Norway.

Wiig was born in Kristiansund, Norway. He served as vicar in Karasjok from 1923 to 1934 and in Sortland from 1934 to 1945. He was then the dean of Finnmark from 1945 until 1951 and he was the dean of Tromsø Cathedral from 1951 until 1952. In 1952, he became the first bishop of the Diocese of Nord-Hålogaland, a position he held until 1961. He died on 10 July 1974.

References

1891 births
1974 deaths
Bishops of Hålogaland
20th-century Lutheran bishops
People from Kristiansund